200 Liberty Street, formerly known as One World Financial Center, is one of four towers that comprise the Brookfield Place complex in the Financial District of Lower Manhattan in New York City. The building is on Liberty Street between South End Avenue and West Street. The building opened in 1986 as part of the World Financial Center and was designed by Cesar Pelli & Associates.

Similarly to other WFC buildings it has a unique roof which is a truncated square pyramid. It is connected to the rest of the complex by a skybridge over Liberty Street.

The building is located across the street from the World Trade Center site and was significantly damaged in the September 11 attacks. The initial dust cloud and other explosions shattered many windows, heavily damaging nearby Winter Garden Atrium and other buildings of the World Financial Center complex. It was closed for several months and reopened in 2002 after extensive restoration.

It was renamed 200 Liberty Street when the rest of the complex became Brookfield Place in 2014.

Notable tenants
Associated Press
Cadwalader, Wickersham & Taft
Deloitte and Touche
Dow Jones & Co.
Fidelity Investments
Financial Industry Regulatory Authority 
GfK
National Financial Services
Northwestern Mutual
Royal Alliance
Santander Bank
The Wall Street Journal
Willis Towers Watson

See also

 World Trade Center
 Brookfield Place (New York City)
 List of tallest buildings in New York City

References

External links

Emporis database

1986 establishments in New York City
Office buildings completed in 1985
Skyscraper office buildings in Manhattan
Brookfield Place (New York City)
Brookfield Properties buildings
Battery Park City
West Side Highway